Harley John Vaughan Usill (13 July 1925 – 7 October 1991) was a British record company executive. He was joint founder and managing director of British record label Argo Records.
 
After an extended period in various occupations, including a period as assistant director to documentary maker Humphrey Jennings, Usill started Argo in 1951. The company released primarily spoken-word recordings. Due to cash problems, the company was taken over by British Decca in 1957, though with Usill remaining as Managing Director, and being given pretty much full autonomy to run the record label as he wished.

After Argo's parent company was absorbed by Polygram in 1979, Usill ended his connection with Argo and established ASV the following year.

References

External links 
 https://web.archive.org/web/20120207064550/http://www.argo-records.com/history.html
 https://web.archive.org/web/20120810145544/http://www.kevindaly.org.uk/biography/argo/

1925 births
1991 deaths